Reggie Hannah (August 4, 1959 – October 23, 2015) was an American basketball player.

A native of Titusville, Florida, Hannah led Titusville High to a pair of state title appearances in the mid-1970s. He played college basketball for Florida and South Alabama before being selected by the Cleveland Cavaliers in the fourth round (70th overall pick) of 1982 NBA draft. He never played in the NBA, but did play in Sweden, France, and the Netherlands. Hannah struggled with drug addiction. According to Florida Today, Hannah died on October 23, 2015 of pancreatic cancer.

References

1959 births
2015 deaths
American expatriate basketball people in France
American expatriate basketball people in Sweden
American expatriate basketball people in the Netherlands
Basketball players from Florida
Cleveland Cavaliers draft picks
Florida Gators men's basketball players
Parade High School All-Americans (boys' basketball)
People from Titusville, Florida
Power forwards (basketball)
South Alabama Jaguars men's basketball players
Wyoming Wildcatters players
American men's basketball players